Ahmer Khan (born 11 May 1992) is a Kashmir-based Independent multimedia journalist well known across the regions to cover conflict, humanitarian crisis, human rights and migration particularly in South Asia.

Biography 
Born and brought up in a conflict region, Ahmer Khan, lost his father at the age of 10, and spent his early life in Srinagar.

He attended his school and college both in Kashmir and was involved in the field of journalism from the school itself. While in College, Khan's work appeared in Al Jazeera as he started working as a freelancer in 2014. In 2015, Ahmer went to Nepal to cover the most devastating earthquake at Nepal that killed more than 8000 people.

Reporting 
Ahmer's work covers humanitarian crises, migration, conflict, and life in South Asian countries

Reports on South Asia and humanitarian grounds

In 2022, Ahmer reported on the extinction of the trams of Kolkata in India by documenting a film "Fighting to save the Last Trams of India" for SCMP News. In the same year, Khan covered the humanitarian cause from Assam, through his film for Vice, Muslims in India are Losing Their Rights and Homes. Ahmer also documented the deadly conspiracy theory, Love Jehad for The Guardian in 2022.

In 2021, Ahmer highlighted yet another human threatening story, "Muslims in India’s Tripura state fear another revenge attack"  in TRT world from India's Tripura. Same year, when the whole world was affected by Global pandemic, Ahmer managed to report a life threatening and devastating story as a film, Inside India's Covid Hell for Vice News. Same year, on the global pandemic, Ahmer cinematographed a visual story, The Vaccine Divide, on how the Covid Vaccines are being used as a private property by the men in chair for The Intercept. In 2021, again on the pandemic scene, Ahmer filmed a story that narrated the struggles of Health workers to bring Covid Vaccines to their region, "Health workers trek to remote areas to bring Covid-19 vaccines to Indian-administered Kashmir", SCMP. In 2021, Ahmer also reported about demolishment on orchards in a story, "The Ill Fruits of Demographic Engineering in Kashmir" for News Line Magazine

Reports on migration and from Conflict zones

Ahmer has covered positive and hopeful stories about migrations and conflict zones that include "The Uighur and Syrian refugees making a home together in Turkey" for Al Jazeera and How a local delivery startup outplayed big foreign competitors in Kashmir for Rest of World

Ahmer has reported about the survival of Rohingya people, in a story for Vice News These are the Rohingya Children Who Escaped Myanmar's 'Ethnic Cleansing'.

Besides, Ahmer has also reported stories about how people cope in natural calamities like floods and earthquakes.

Awards and milestones 
Ahmer Khan has received recognition across the regions and has been awarded with numerous awards both locally as well as globally.

 2018, Ahmer bagged Lorenzo Natali Price for his story A school under metro bridge.
 2019, Ahmer won AFP’s Kate Webb Prize for the indispensable media coverage on impact of restrictions in Jammu and Kashmir after abrogation of article 370.
 2020, Ahmer, with his team mate, Isobel Yeung, has been awarded  with the Edward R. Murrow Award by Overseas Press club for their film India burning with his team, was awarded with 24th Human Rights Press Award  for the short movie Defending Kashmir. A glorious year - 2020,  Ahmer was a finalist in the prestigious Emmy Awards for the film India Burning  besides being awarded with Rory Peck Award  for the same movie India Burning in the same year
 2021, Ahmer brought home Lovei award for his TRT world digital video Love Jehad and was awarded with Alfred. I Dupont - Columbia Award  for his famous film India Burning. Besides this, Ahmer also became a finalist in Scripps Howard Awards for the same film India Burning 
 2022, Ahmer was nominated again for Emmy Awards for the film Inside India's Covid Hell, Vice News

References 

Indian journalists
Indian artists
Indian storytellers
Indian filmmakers
1992 births
Living people